Smita V. Crishna is an Indian stock trader who is one of the richest women in India. She has the net worth of $2.5 Billion.

References 

Living people
Year of birth missing (living people)
Indian stock traders
Female billionaires
Indian billionaires